Björn Bjelfvenstam (born 19 February 1929) is a Swedish film actor. He was born in Uppsala, Sweden.

Bjelfvenstam began his acting career in the theater in Uppsala. He studied first with the Axel Witzanskys theater school from 1949-1950. Later, we worked at Malmö City Theater between 1953 and 1957 under Ingmar Bergman's leadership. He probably remains best-known for his supporting roles in the Bergman films Smiles of a Summer Night (1955) and Wild Strawberries (1957).

Filmography

 Trots (1952)
 Secrets of Women (1952)
 The Shadow (1953)
 Dreams (1955)
 Smiles of a Summer Night (1955)
 Last Pair Out (1956)
 Wild Strawberries (1957)
 Rider in Blue (1959)
 Av hjärtans lust (1960)
 En historia till fredag (TV mini-series, 1965)
 Kvällspressen (TV series, one episode, 1992)
 Den vite riddaren (TV mini-series, 1994)
 Tre kronor (TV series, 1994-1998, 91 episodes)

References

External links

1929 births
Living people
People from Uppsala
20th-century Swedish male actors